Bentley is a village and civil parish in the Babergh district of Suffolk, England, about  southwest of Ipswich. The 2011 Census recorded the parish's population as 776.

Bentley has a Church of England parish church, a Reformed Baptist church, a Church of England primary school, a pub, a Village Hall and a riding school. A community owned village shop opened in the summer of 2016.

Bentley has a parish council. It has also a forum called Bentley Free Speech  that comments on matters relating to the parish council and other village issues. There also an alternative news site called Bentley News, which is managed by a local resident.

The Eastern Union Railway was built through the parish and opened on 15 July 1846. The station was a junction between 1847 and 1965 for the Hadleigh branch line. The branch line also had a short-lived station called Bentley Church (1847-1853).

The main line railway is now (2016) known as the Great Eastern Main Line.

References

External links

Bentley Parish Council
Bentley Village Hall (Suffolk) 
The Case is Altered

Babergh District
Civil parishes in Suffolk
Villages in Suffolk